Aleppo railway station more commonly Gare de Baghdad, is the 2nd oldest railway station in Syria and the main station of the city of Aleppo. It was opened in 1912 as part of the Berlin–Baghdad railway. The first ever trip from the station was towards the town of Jarabulus.

History
The Baghdad railway station was built in 1912 by German engineers as part of the Berlin Baghdad line, thus the railway had reached Aleppo with the branch to Tripoli, by the start of World War I; and onwards to Nusaybin by October 1918. 

The Turks, who sided with Germany and the Central Powers, decided to recover the infrastructure south of Aleppo to Lebanon in 1917. The Baghdad Railway created opportunity and problems for both sides, being unfinished but running just south of the then defined Syrian–Turkish border. 

Post war, the border was redrawn, and the railway was now north of the border. From 1922 the Baghdad Railway was worked in succession by two French companies, who were liquidated in 1933 when the border was again redrawn, placing the Baghdad Railway section again in Syrian control. 

As a result, a new agreement was achieved between the French controlled Syria and the Ottoman Sham-Hama Railway Company (the operator of Damascus Railway) to put the Aleppo Railway under the management of the company for 15 years. As a result, the Aleppo railway line was connected with Damascus. 

During the 1940s, after the independence of Syria from the French mandate, the management agreement was expired and the Syrian government itself took over the administration of the Aleppo Railway with the establishment of the new Syrian Railway Company at the end of the 1940s.

In 1956, the Syrian government decided to purchase the shares of the Sham-Hama Railway Company in Syria. As a result, all railways in Syria were nationalised and operated under one administration. Later, starting from 1 January 1965, the Syrian Railway was reorganised as Chemins de Fer Syriens (CFS), headquartered in Aleppo.

Until 2011, the Aleppo railway station was connected with Damascus, Latakia, Hama, Homs, Qamishly and Deir ez-Zor with daily trips. In 2012, the rail traffic was stopped because of the Syrian civil war. On 25 January 2017, train services resumed in Aleppo for the first time in four years, once again making the station operational. Reconstruction of the Damascus-Aleppo railway line was started in 2020, after its completion and securing rail transport will be resumed.

See also
Hejaz Railway Station
Chemins de Fer Syriens

References

Railway stations opened in 1912
Buildings and structures in Aleppo
Railway stations in Syria
1912 establishments in the Ottoman Empire